The Women's 4 x 400 metres relay athletics events for the 2016 Summer Paralympics took place at the Estádio Olímpico João Havelange at 08:24 on 16 September 2016. A total of one event was contested over this distance with each leg being run by one of the two different classifications, T53 and T54.

Results

T53-54

References

Athletics at the 2016 Summer Paralympics
2016 in women's athletics